

Events
Joseph Haydn begins his second visit to London
Carl Ditters von Dittersdorf is expelled from the palace in Johannesberg after a dispute with his patron Philipp Gotthard von Schaffgotsch, ending nearly a quarter of a century in his service there.

Classical music
Ludwig van Beethoven – String Trio No. 1 in E-flat major
William Billings – The Continental Harmony
Benjamin Carr – The Federal Overture
Domenico Cimarosa – Il trionfo della fede, sacred oratorio premiered May 3 in Naples
Muzio Clementi 
Violin Sonata in C major, Op.30
Flute Sonata in A major, Op.31
3 Piano Sonatas, Op. 33
Piano Trio, WO 6
Jan Ladislav Dussek – 12 Leçons progressives
Anton Eberl – Piano Sonata in C minor, Op. 1
Joseph Eybler 
Christmas Oratorio
3 String Quartets, Op. 1
Lev Gurilyov – Piano Sonata No.1
Joseph Haydn
Symphony No. 100 in G major, "Military"
Symphony No. 101 in D major, "Clock"
Symphony No.102 in B-flat major, Hob.I:102
Divertimento in C major, Hob.IV:1
Divertimento in G major, Hob.IV:4
Piano Trios, Op.36
Piano Trio in G major, Hob.XV:32
Piano Sonata No. 51 in D major, Hob XVI:51
Piano Sonata No. 52 in E-flat, Hob XVI:52
6 Psalms, Hob.XXIII:suppl.
6 English Canzonettas, Hob.XXVIa:25-30
Johann Nepomuk Hummel – 3 Fugues, Op. 7
Jean Xavier Lefèvre – Clarinet Concerto No.4 in G minor, IJL 1
Johann Simon Mayr  – La Passione, oratorio in Italian
Etienne Nicolas Méhul – Chant du départ
F. D Mouchy – La Mort de Louis XVI, Op.3
William Parkinson – 3 Sonatas for the pianoforte or harpsichord, Op. 1
William Parsons – The Court Minuets for His Majesty's Birth Day, 1794
Ignaz Pleyel – 3 Keyboard Trios, B.446-448
Pierre Rode – Air varié, Op.10
Antonio Rosetti – Symphony in F major, M.A49/I:25 or 24
Friedrich Wilhelm Rust – Keyboard Sonata No. 12 in D major, CzaR 11
Christian Gotthilf Tag – 12 Kurze und leichte Orgelvorspiele, 1 Orgelsinfonie
Giovanni Battista Viotti – Violin Concerto No.27 in C major
Christoph Ernst Friedrich Weyse – Piano Sonatas No. 5-8

Opera
Luigi Cherubini – Eliza (premiered Dec. 13 in Paris)
Domenico Cimarosa 
Le astuzie femminili (premiered Aug. 26 in Naples)
Penelope (premiered Dec. 26 in Naples)
Francois-Joseph Gossec – Le triomphe de la République, RH 618 (divertissement, premiered Jan. 27 in Paris)
Friedrich Heinrich Himmel – Il primo navigatore
Johann Simon Mayr – Saffo
Étienne Méhul – Horatius Coclès, Mélidore et Phrosine
Carl Ditters von Dittersdorf – Das Gespenst mit der Trommel

Methods and theory writings 

 Matthew Camidge – Instructions, 8 Sonatinas, and Useful Preludes
 Francois Devienne – Nouvelle méthode théorique et pratique pour la flûte
 Anton Joseph Hampel – Méthode pour Cor
 Nicola Sala – Regole del contrappunto pratico

Births
January 6 – Kašpar Mašek, composer (d. 1873)
April 7 – Giovanni Battista Rubini, tenor
April 9 
Aristide Farrenc, musician and music publisher (died 1865)
Theobald Boehm, composer and flautist (died 1881)
May 23 – Ignaz Moscheles, composer and piano virtuoso (d. 1870)
August 10 – Princess Amalie of Saxony, composer (d. 1870)
September 10 – François Benoist, organist and composer (d. 1878)
September 16 – Wenzel Gährich, composer (died 1864)
September 29 – William Michael Rooke, violinist and composer (d. 1849)
October 4 – Justina Casagli, operatic soprano
October 7 – Wilhelm Müller, lyricist (died 1827)
October 13 – Anselm Hüttenbrenner, composer (d. 1868)
October 18 – Ferdinand Schubert, Austrian composer (died 1859)
October 23 – Joseph Panny, composer and violinist (died 1838)
October 29 – William Bingham Tappan, hymnist (died 1849)
November 3 – William Cullen Bryant, patron of the arts and poet (died 1878)
December 6 – Luigi Lablache, operatic bass
date unknown 
Mirza Shafi Vazeh, lyricist (died 1852)

Deaths
April 26 – Johan Foltmar, composer (b. 1714)
May 6 – Jean-Jacques Beauvarlet-Charpentier, composer and organist (born 1734)
July 13 – Josse-François-Joseph Benaut, composer and musician (born 1741)
July 17 – Jean-Frédéric Edelmann, composer (b. 1749) (executed)
July 22 – Jean-Benjamin de Laborde, composer (born 1734)
July 25 – André Chénier, lyricist (born 1762)
August 7 – Edmund Angerer, composer (born 1740)
August 11 – Jakob Friedrich Kleinknecht, German composer (born 1722)
August 25 – Leopold August Abel, composer (b. 1717)
November 9 – Gregory Skovoroda, poet and composer (b. 1722)
November 20 – Mattia Verazi, Italian librettist (born c. 1730)
November 22 – Alison Cockburn, lyricist (born 1712) 

 
18th century in music
Music by year